Who Will Marry Mary? is a 1913 American action film serial starring Mary Fuller. The film is a sequel to the 1912 serial, What Happened to Mary. While most of the serial is considered to be lost, incomplete prints of episodes one and five survive in the EYE Film Instituut Nederland archive and at Keene Stage College respectively. A digitized print of the first episode "A Proposal From The Duke" was uploaded onto YouTube by the EYE Film Instituut Channel in 2016.

Cast
 Mary Fuller as Mary Cuyler
 Ben F. Wilson as Captain Justin Bradford (as Ben Wilson)
 Richard Tucker as Duke Leonardo de Ferrara
 Harry Beaumont
 Miriam Nesbitt
 Marc McDermott
 Harold M. Shaw
 William Wadsworth
 May Abbey
 Frank McGlynn Sr.
 Walter Edwin

Chapter titles
 A Proposal From The Duke
 A Proposal From The Spanish Don
 A Proposal From The Sculptor
 A Proposal From Nobody
 A Proposal Deferred
 A Proposal From Mary

References

External links

1913 films
1913 lost films
American black-and-white films
Lost American films
American silent serial films
Lost action drama films
American action drama films
1910s action drama films
Silent action drama films
1913 drama films
1910s American films
Silent American drama films